The Ministry of Oil and Gas was one of the governmental bodies of Kazakhstan and part of the cabinet. The ministry had the function of developing and implementing policies related to petroleum and petroleum products.

History and profile
The ministry was established on 12 March 2010 and is the successor of the ministry of energy and mineral resources.

Uzakbai Karabalin has been the minister of  oil and gas since July 2013. He replaced Sauat Mynbayev  in the post. Mynbayev was the first minister of oil and gas.

The main function of the ministry is to oversee and regulate the oil and gas sector in the country which was largely carried out by the national oil company, KazMunaiGas, until the establishment of the ministry.

References

2010 establishments in Kazakhstan
Energy in Kazakhstan
Oil and Gas
Kazakhstan, Oil and Gas
Energy ministries